Pip Lamb (born 11 February 1959 in Hereford, England) is a former motorcycle speedway rider in National League (speedway)

He started his career as an Oxford Cheetah and is most associated with that club. He attended Peter Jarman's speedway school at Cowley Stadium in 1976.
It was on the track at Cowley Stadium, Oxford where he had his career ending accident.

An eyewitness described the accident as Pip having mechanical failure, putting his hand up to signal retirement and drifting out to the fence. 
He was suddenly thrown forward from his bike as if his footrest had entangled with the wire link fencing, going headfirst into a steel post.
In 2010, Barry Briggs, aged 75, made a motorcycle journey round the UK to raise money for 12 ex-speedway riders confined to wheelchairs after racing accidents. They were Krzysztof Cegielski, Lawrence Hare, Neil Hewitt, Per Jonsson, Graham Miles, Paul Mitchell, Joe Owen, John Simmons, Gary Stead, Steve Weatherley, Alan Wilkinson, and Pip Lamb.

Grasstrack
Pip had a very good Grasstrack career and in 1976 he won the Midland Center Championship.

References

External links
 https://web.archive.org/web/20140719113710/http://www.cradleyspeedway.pwp.blueyonder.co.uk/riders.htm
 http://www.lovespeedway24.co.uk/teams/peterborough-panthers/legend_briggs_bike_ends_up_in_ipswich_1_750597
 http://www.briggo.net/CharityRide.aspx 
 http://myweb.tiscali.co.uk/speedwayyears/1978.html
 http://grasstrackgb.co.uk/pip-lamb/

1959 births
British speedway riders
Cradley Heathens riders
Oxford Cheetahs riders
Exeter Falcons riders
Coventry Bees riders
Living people